New College is a further and higher education institution in Swindon, Wiltshire, England. There are two main campuses, Queens Drive and North Star, as well as an Adult Learning Centre in Swindon town centre.

The College delivers qualifications and training opportunities for learners of all ages and abilities including GCSEs, A Levels, T Levels, vocational qualifications, higher education and degree-level courses, apprenticeships, professional and business training, and leisure courses.

Facilities 
On 17 August 2020, New College merged with Swindon College. Both campuses are a short distance from Swindon’s town centre, railway station and central bus station.

Queens Drive Campus 
The Queens Drive campus is just outside the town centre, near Coate Water Country Park. Facilities include:

 The Phoenix Theatre
 Studios for media makeup, art, design, fashion and textiles; photography studio with darkroom
 Recording studio with Live Room, Control Room and hardware and sequencing software
 Two Dance studios
 Sports Centre with sports hall, fitness suite and exercise studio
 3G pitch
 E-learning with Virtual Learning Environment (VLE)
 Over 1500 computers including tablets, Apple computers, Windows PCs and netbooks
 STEM facilities including nine science labs.

North Star Campus 
Formally the site of Swindon College, the North Star campus is in the centre of Swindon near the railway station. Facilities include:

 Wellbeing Centre
 Gym
 Learning Development Centre
 Purpose-built construction centre with outdoor simulated construction site
 Training workshops for automotive, engineering and construction
 Bespoke facilities for animal care
 The Academy, a commercial hair and beauty salon
 A professional training restaurant, coffee shop and specialist teaching kitchens
 Computer suites.

Courses 
New College is known for its range of courses offered, with almost 40 A Level subjects – including unusual options such as Ceramics, History (Tudors & Stuarts), Archaeology and Environmental Sciences – and a selection of vocational courses including Construction, Engineering, Vehicle Maintenance, Hospitality & Catering, Public Services, Hair & Beauty, Health Care & Childcare, Sport, Performing Arts and Art, Design & Photography. The College also offers a substantial number of programmes at Levels 1 and 2 as well as part-time qualification, leisure courses and professional training for adults.

New College runs a football academy where students train and play, usually alongside an academic course. Until 2020 they fielded New College Swindon F.C. (previously New College Academy F.C.) who competed in the Hellenic League. The college also offers a basketball academy and a netball academy.

University partnerships 
New College Swindon has formed strategic partnerships with the University of Gloucestershire, Oxford Brookes University and Bath Spa University to offer a range of foundation degrees and degrees.

Notable alumni 
Former and current sporting alumni include Shelley Rudman (skeleton bob), Laura Halford (rhythmic gymnastics), Debbie Palmer (speed skating and ice hockey), Jaime King (swimming), Jon Lewis (cricket), Matt O'Dowd (athletics), Louise Hunt (wheelchair tennis), and Anna Mayes (netball).

Achievements 
New College was assessed as being GOOD when last visited by Ofsted in November 2017.

A Level pass rate of 98%, with over 41% of grades at A*A or B (Summer 2019)
 Number one for College Achievement rates amongst local colleges
 The top performing state school/college for Level progress in Swindon and Cirencester (Jan 2020 performance tables)

See also
 Education in Swindon

References 

Education in Swindon
Educational institutions established in 1983
Further education colleges in Wiltshire
1983 establishments in England